Stephen Brian Hodge (born 25 October 1962) is an English retired footballer who played as a midfielder. He enjoyed a high-profile club and international career in the 1980s and 1990s, the high point being reaching the 1986 World Cup quarter final against Argentina.

Prior to the 2013–14 season Hodge was appointed development squad coach at Notts County.

On 27 October 2013 Hodge was appointed caretaker manager,  reverting to his position as development squad coach on 6 November 2013 with the appointment of Shaun Derry as manager.

Playing career

Nottingham Forest

A left-footed midfielder who was comfortable in a central or wide position, Hodge was born in Nottingham and joined his boyhood club Nottingham Forest as an apprentice in 1980; he made his debut against Ipswich Town on the final day of the 1981–82 season.

A favourite of Forest's manager Brian Clough, Hodge became a first-team regular the following season as the club tried to build a new young team after the side which won two European Cups began to age and disintegrate. Hodge was a frequent goalscorer from midfield as Forest consolidated their League position but were unable to push for trophies other than a semi-final in the UEFA Cup in 1984, where they lost in controversial circumstances to Anderlecht.

In the summer of 1985, Forest surprisingly accepted an offer of £450,000 from Aston Villa and Hodge – whose nickname was Harry – made his move from the East Midlands to the West Midlands.

Aston Villa
The move to Birmingham did work initially but the team was in decline and once Hodge had received England recognition, it was perceived by the Villa fans that he was not fully committed to the team's cause, typified during a 4–1 home defeat by Norwich City where his intended back pass to Kevin Poole was slotted in by a Norwich player – the boos ringing round the ground signalled the beginning of the end for his Villa career. Hodge was sold to Tottenham in December 1986 for £650,000.

Tottenham Hotspur
Tottenham manager David Pleat put Hodge wide on the left of a vibrant, attacking five-man midfield which also included England teammates Hoddle and Chris Waddle, Argentinian veteran Osvaldo Ardiles and hardworking ballwinner Paul Allen. Each were expected to contribute goals and assists behind one main centre forward, Clive Allen, and it worked. Hodge scored on his debut on Boxing Day 1986 in a 4–0 thrashing of West Ham United and scored three times more while creating plenty for others as Spurs chased three trophies.

Sadly for Hodge, his quest for domestic success eluded him again as Spurs were knocked out by fierce rivals Arsenal in the semi-finals of the League Cup, tailed off in their First Division title charge and came third, and lost a thrilling 1987 FA Cup Final at Wembley against Coventry City, following an outstanding 4–1 semi-final win over Watford in which Hodge scored twice.

Return to Forest
Clough paid Spurs £550,000 to take Hodge back to Nottingham Forest. The club won the Full Members Cup in 1989 and then reached the League Cup final, with Hodge finally winning a major domestic medal: the 3–1 win over Luton Town at Wembley saw him play a crucial part as it was he, making a foraging run from deep, who was brought down for the penalty which Nigel Clough converted, setting Forest on the road to victory. A week later, however, Hodge was one of the Forest players who had to cope with the horrors of the Hillsborough disaster during the opening minutes of their FA Cup semi-final against Liverpool. He played in the rescheduled game at Old Trafford, which Liverpool won 3–1.

The following season, Hodge played as Forest retained the League Cup with a 1–0 win over Oldham Athletic, but by the next year he was struggling to hold down a regular place in the team's midfield after the emergence of teenage Irish phenomenon Roy Keane to partner Garry Parker, who had become the first-choice central midfielder despite being the only one of the three never to play international football. He was only named as a substitute by Clough for the 1991 FA Cup Final against his old club Tottenham Hotspur; he came on as a second-half substitute but Spurs ran out 2–1 winners after extra time.

Leeds United
In the summer of 1991, Hodge was sold to Leeds United for £900,000 – the highest transfer fee he had commanded. He struggled to win a regular place at Elland Road but did make a significant contribution to the league title winning side of 1991–92, winning a championship medal. In that season he made 23 appearances and scored seven goals; his goal tally included two braces in games against Sheffield United (won 4-3) and Southampton (drew 3-3) and the only goal in a 1-0 win over Liverpool. In 1994 Hodge went on loan to Derby County.

Late career

He joined Queens Park Rangers for a nominal fee in 1994. Two seasons followed with Hodge playing just 15 times.

Next he joined Watford. He played twice for them in the 1995–96 season.

An unsuccessful trial at Walsall came in the autumn of 1996, followed by a brief spell playing in Hong Kong. He signed for Division Three side Leyton Orient in March 1998, playing just once before finally retiring from playing at the end of the season.

International
Though he was only three caps into his international career by the time Bobby Robson announced his squad for the 1986 FIFA World Cup, Hodge was given a place on the plane to Mexico, coming on as a substitute in the first two group games against Portugal and Morocco, which England lost and drew respectively. Making urgent changes for the final group game against Poland, Robson put Hodge in the side and he responded with an outstanding personal display within a crushing team performance. Hodge's superb left wing cross on the run gave Gary Lineker his second goal in a first half hat-trick which eased England's passage to the second round.

There they faced Paraguay, and it was a sliding, stretching Hodge who kept in an over-hit cross from Glenn Hoddle, by pushing the ball into the path of Lineker to tap home. Again England were 3–0 victors, with Argentina awaiting ominously in the last eight. Here Hodge would earn his own somewhat dubious place in football history – inadvertently setting up Maradona's 'Hand of God' goal – and ending the game with a highly prized memento, Maradona's No. 10 shirt. The shirt currently resides in The National Football Museum in Manchester.

Hodge retained his place in the team as England began their qualification campaign for the 1988 European Championships with victories over Northern Ireland and Yugoslavia, but was not selected for the finals squad.

Robson recalled Hodge for the first game after the European Championships – a 1–0 win over Denmark at Wembley – as he had been briefly back on form at club level with Nottingham Forest. He was again cast aside internationally afterwards, but his club form improved dramatically and he found himself regularly called up by Robson as a result, though actual appearances were scarce.

He managed to force his way back into the England reckoning with a strong appearance as a substitute against Italy at Wembley, by which time England's place at the 1990 FIFA World Cup was secured. Hodge subsequently played in the final four warm-up matches before the tournament itself. To his delight, Hodge made the final squad but he then suffered an injury and as a consequence was the only outfield England player not to kick a ball during the tournament, even though England reached the semi-finals. He didn't even regain his fitness in time to get on the pitch for the third-place play-off game.

Robson quit after the World Cup and Hodge was not selected initially by successor Graham Taylor. Taylor brought Hodge back for a 2–0 win over Cameroon early in 1991 and he was then given his 24th and final cap in a 1–0 win against Turkey in İzmir in a qualifier for the 1992 European Championships.

Coaching career
Having  gained an A coaching licence Hodge worked with Roy McFarland at Chesterfield.

He had brief roles at Notts County as development squad manager, and as caretaker manager of the first team.

'Hand of God' shirt
Following Maradona’s death in November 2020, Hodge was subjected to numerous requests from people wishing to buy the shirt he had swapped with Maradona at the end of the World Cup quarter-final in 1986. Hodge said, "It’s not for sale. I am not trying to sell it." However, Hodge felt that it was the right time to sell the shirt through the reputable international auction house Sotheby's in April 2022.

After the shirt sale was announced Maradona’s daughter Dalma and ex-wife Claudia made claims that the shirt wasn’t the same shirt that Maradona scored both goals in. 
However this was later disproved by Sotheby’s after working with Photo Resolution imagery to determine the authenticity of the shirt and also referring to Maradona's autobiography in which he states that he gave the shirt to Hodge in the tunnel after the game prior to returning to the changing room.  In May 2022, the shirt sold for £7.1m, a record for a shirt worn during a sporting event.

Bibliography
In 2010 Hodge released an autobiography entitled, "The Man With Maradona's Shirt".

Honours

Club
Tottenham Hotspur
FA Cup runner-up: 1986–87

Nottingham Forest
FA Cup runner-up: 1990–91
Football League Cup: 1988–89, 1989–90
Full Members' Cup: 1988–89

Leeds United
Football League First Division: 1991–92
FA Charity Shield: 1992

International
England U21
UEFA European Under-21 Championship: 1984

England
FIFA World Cup fourth-place: 1990

Individual
PFA Team of the Year: 1989–90 First Division
Nottingham Forest Player of the Year: 1982–83

References
Specific

General

1962 births
Living people
Footballers from Nottingham
English footballers
England under-21 international footballers
England B international footballers
England international footballers
Association football midfielders
Nottingham Forest F.C. players
Aston Villa F.C. players
Tottenham Hotspur F.C. players
Leeds United F.C. players
Derby County F.C. players
Queens Park Rangers F.C. players
Watford F.C. players
Leyton Orient F.C. players
English football managers
Notts County F.C. managers
English Football League players
Premier League players
1986 FIFA World Cup players
1990 FIFA World Cup players
English Football League managers
English autobiographers
FA Cup Final players